Haase may refer to:

Haase (car), a Veteran Era car make

People with the surname
Barry Haase (born 1945), Australian politician
Bertil Haase (1923–2014), Swedish modern pentathlete
Camila Haase Quiros, Costa Rican swimmer
Christian Haase (born 1966), German politician
Curt Haase (1881–1943), German general
Eric Haase (born 1992), American baseball player
Erich Haase (1859–1894), German physician and entomologist
Ernie Haase (born 1964), American tenor
Esther Haase (born 1966), German photographer
Friedrich Haase (1827–1911), German actor
Friedrich Gottlob Haase (1808–1867), German classical scholar
Helga Haase (1934–1989), Polish-East German speed skater
Hugo Haase (1863–1919), German politician
Jerod Haase (born 1974), American college basketball coach
John Haase (author) (1923–2006), German dentist and author
John Haase (criminal) (born 1948), British gangster and drug dealer
Jürgen Haase (athlete) (born 1945), German Olympian runner
Mandy Haase (born 1982), German hockey player
Martin Haase (born 1962), German Esperantist and professor of linguistics
Rebekka Haase (born 1993), German sprinter
Robin Haase (born 1987), Dutch tennis player
Ullrich Haase (born 1962), British philosopher
Werner Haase (1900–1950), German professor of medicine and SS office

Surnames from nicknames